A Girl Called Jules is a 1970 Italian drama film directed by Tonino Valerii.

Cast
 Silvia Dionisio as Jules
 Gianni Macchia as Franco
 Esmeralda Ruspoli as Laura, mother of Jules
 Anna Moffo as Lia
 Maurizio Degli Esposti as Lorenzo
 John Steiner as the guardian
 Roberto Chevalier as Camillo
 Livio Barbo as Amerigo
 Riccardo Garrone as Carvalli
 Raúl Martínez as Luciano
 Malisa Longo as Serafina
 Nino Nini as priest of Santa Maria del Giglio
 Umberto Raho as Father Dario, the confessor 
 Ivano Staccioli as Professor of philosophy 
 Tonino Valerii (cameo)

Production
After directing three Spaghetti Western films, director Tonino Valerii was worried about being typecast as a director of only Spaghetti Westerns. He began exploring other genres and was initially interested in adapting Livia De Stefani's novel Black Grapes. The original story of Black Grapes involved gangsters, a topic that became popular in Italy after the release of Damiano Damiani's The Day of the Owl.

Valerii was introduced to producer Francesco Mazzei by Riz Ortolani. When approaching him for Black Grapes, Mazzei countered the offer to film an adaptation of La ragazza di nome Giulio.

Screenplay credits on the actual film prints state that Marcello Coscia, Bruno Di Geronimo, Maurio Di Nardo, Francesco Mazzei and Valerii are responsible for the film's screenplay. Valerii disregarded this stating that these people "did not actually write the film!" and that the film was written by Giuseppe Murgia and Beppe Bellecca.

Joan Fontaine was originally cast to play Laura, the title character's mother, but she left the set a few days before the end of shooting due to economic disagreements with the producer Francesco Mazzei; she was replaced by Esmeralda Ruspoli and all her scenes had to be reshot. The film received mixed reviews.

Release
A Girl Called Jules was distributed theatrically in Italy by PAC where it was first shown in Italy on 26 June 1970. The film grossed a total of 542.076 million Italian lire domestically. It was entered into the 20th Berlin International Film Festival where it was supposed to be screened on the last day of the festival, but the screening was eventually cancelled as the festival was interrupted on 5 July 1970.

References

Footnotes

Sources

External links

DVD of the film

1970 films
1970 drama films
Italian drama films
Films directed by Tonino Valerii
Films scored by Riz Ortolani
1970s English-language films
1970s Italian films